Earl Thomas Watkins, Jr. (January 29, 1920 in San Francisco – July 1, 2007 in San Francisco) was an American jazz drummer.

Watkins was a percussionist in a United States Navy band during World War II, and returned to San Francisco after the war. He played with Wilbert Baranco in 1946 and did extensive work as a sideman and session musician in the 1950s, including with Kid Ory, Flip Phillips, Muggsy Spanier, and Bob Scobey. He joined Earl Hines's ensemble in San Francisco, touring and recording with him until 1961.

References
Howard Rye, "Earl Watkins". The New Grove Dictionary of Jazz. 2nd edition, ed. Barry Kernfeld.

American jazz drummers
1920 births
2007 deaths
20th-century American drummers
American male drummers
Jazz musicians from San Francisco
20th-century American male musicians
American male jazz musicians